Fuel TV may refer to:

Fuel TV (Australian TV channel), a sports channel
Fuel TV (Portuguese TV channel), a sports channel
FUEL TV, now Fox Sports 2, an American sports channel